It's Only Me is the third studio album by American rapper Lil Baby. It was released on October 14, 2022 through Quality Control Music, Motown, Wolfpack, and 4 Pockets Full. The album features guest appearances from Nardo Wick, Young Thug, Fridayy, Future, Rylo Rodriguez, Jeremih, EST Gee, and Pooh Shiesty. It was supported by two singles: "In a Minute" and "Heyy".

Promotion and release
On April 8, 2022, Lil Baby released the lead single of the album "In a Minute". The rapper first teased the album in August 2022 on his social media. On September 2, 2022, he announced the title and release date of the album. The day also saw the release of the non-album single "Detox". The cover art depicts different stages of Lil Baby's life as an allusion to Mount Rushmore. The visual serves as a response to protests over his inclusion on Mount Rushmore-murals which included him over other Atlanta rappers. On October 10, 2022, he released the second single of the album, "Heyy", and revealed the tracklist.

Critical reception

It's Only Me received generally positive reviews from critics. At Metacritic, which assigns a normalized rating out of 100 to reviews from professional publications, the album received an average score of 66, based on nine reviews, indicating "generally favorable reviews".

In a positive review, Clash wrote, "This album undoubtedly sees Lil Baby solidify his spot and reaffirm the greatness he’s presented the past few years," adding, "It captures the trials of his journey so far whilst celebrating his current success and the gross potential to do even more." Alphonse Pierre of Pitchfork was more mixed, writing, "Lil Baby is at his best when he's using [his] tricks to switch between moods, but there's just one on It's Only Me, and it’s indifference: not in the too-cool-to-care kind of way, but in the way when words have no weight behind them."

In a review for AllMusic, it was claimed that, "Baby approaching nearly every track with repetitive flows and lyrics that feel disconnected and static. Ultimately It's Only Me sticks to the formula that's taken Lil Baby to the top, but somehow fails to communicate the personality and creative fire that was hard to miss on earlier albums." Similarly, NME'''s Niall Smith declared that, "If the trimmings were removed from ‘It’s Only Me’, it might rival his previous releases – instead it’s a few notches shy of greatness."

In a more positive review for Rolling Stone, Jayson Buford stated that, "Most of the time, Baby is in prime form here — technical enough to earn his hip-hop cred, and stylistic enough to keep the uncommon kids from feeling like he’s common. When he’s at his best, it’s best to let him gobble you whole."

Commercial performanceIt's Only Me'' debuted atop the US Billboard 200 dated October 29, 2022, earning 216,000 album-equivalent units (including 6,500 pure album sales) in its first week of availability in the United States. The album earned a total of 288.97 million official streams for its tracks, the third-highest figure for one-week streams for an album in 2022. It is Lil Baby's third US number-one album.

Track listing

Charts

Weekly charts

Year-end charts

References

2022 albums
Lil Baby albums